Ina is a 1982 Indian Malayalam-language romantic drama film directed by I. V. Sasi. The film explores teen lust, child marriage and the consequences. It stars Master Raghu and Devi, while Kanchana, Rasheed and B. K. Pottekkadu play major supporting roles.  The film received strongly positive reviews upon release. It was a bold attempt in Malayalam cinema, and is regarded as a cult film.

The film's basic story is inspired from the 1980 film The Blue Lagoon.

Synopsis
Vinod and Anitha are classmates in school and have their own personal problems. Vinod's stepmother wants to seduce him, and Anitha is an illegitimate child that her mother never wanted. On a rainy day, they take shelter in a train wagon, which starts moving before they could get out and stops next in a forest area a long way away from home. There, they find a couple of recluses – a widow and an ex-army officer – living their own lives and willing to accept them.

As they were in early puberty, they live like normal children. But as puberty stage starts, both experiences teen lust over each other. They couldn't resist each other and starts making love over and over. The widow accepts them as foster children and perform their marriage, but fate intervenes as an incurable disease for Anitha forms rest of the story.

Cast
 Master Raghu as Vinod a.k.a. Vinu
 Kanchana as Aunty
 B. K. Pottekkadu as Khader
 Ashapriya
 Varghese
 Master B. V. Krishnanand as Ratheesh, Ani's brother

Soundtrack
The music was composed by A. T. Ummer and the lyrics were written by Bichu Thirumala.

Remake
The film was remade in November 2011 with newcomers Yuvan and Swathi playing the lead roles. It is written and directed by Mahesh Karanthoor.

References

External links
 
 Ina at the Malayalam Movie Database

1980s Malayalam-language films
1980s romance films
1980s teen romance films
1982 films
Films directed by I. V. Sasi
Indian coming-of-age films
1980s coming-of-age films
Films scored by A. T. Ummer